El Llanquihue is a Chilean daily newspaper published in the city of Puerto Montt. The newspaper was founded in 1885 being the fourth oldest Chilean newspaper in continuous publication.

External links
 El Llanquihue

Spanish-language newspapers
Newspapers published in Chile
Publications established in 1885
Mass media in Puerto Montt
1885 establishments in Chile